Local elections were held in Moldova on 23 May 1999.

Blocul comuniştilor, agrarienilor şi socialiştilor won the elections.

References 

1999 in Moldova
Local elections in Moldova
1999 elections in Moldova